A referendum on eliminating special elections to fill vacant seats in the Legislative Assembly was held in Puerto Rico on 3 November 1964, alongside the general elections. The reforms were approved by 77.5% of voters.

Results

References

1964 referendums
1964
1964 in Puerto Rico
Electoral reform referendums
Electoral reform in Puerto Rico
November 1964 events in North America